Faru may refer to:

 Farukolhufushi or Faru, atoll in the Maldive
 Faru (monk), prominent Buddhist monk during the Tang Dynasty in China.